Øystein Jevanord (born 16 September 1959) is a Norwegian drummer.

He has played with the following bands:
Bridges
Poem
deLillos
a-ha
Dei Nye Kappelanane
Oslo Plektrum
Dog Age
Femi Gange
MT Hammed

References

1959 births
Living people
20th-century Norwegian drummers
21st-century Norwegian drummers
Norwegian rock drummers
Male drummers
Place of birth missing (living people)
20th-century drummers
20th-century Norwegian male musicians
21st-century Norwegian male musicians